The Academy Award for Best Live Action Short Film is an award presented at the annual Academy Awards ceremony. The award has existed, under various names, since 1957.

From 1936 until 1956 there were two separate awards, "Best Short Subject, One-reel" and "Best Short Subject, Two-reel", referring to the running time of the short: a standard reel of film is 1000 feet, or about 11 minutes of run time. A third category "Best Short Subject, color" was used only for 1936 and 1937. From the initiation of short subject awards for 1932 until 1935 the terms were "Best Short Subject, comedy" and "Best Short Subject, novelty".

These categories were merged starting with the 1957 awards, under the name "Short Subjects, Live Action Subjects", which was used until 1970. For the next three years after that, it was known as "Short Subjects, Live Action Films". The current name for the Academy Award for Live Action Short Film was introduced in 1974.

Current academy rules call for the award to be presented to "the individual person most directly responsible for the concept and the creative execution of the film. In the event that more than one individual has been directly and importantly involved in creative decisions, a second statuette may be awarded". The academy defines short as being "not more than 40 minutes, including all credits". Ten films are shortlisted before nominations are announced.

List of winners and nominees

1930s

1940s

1950s

1960s

1970s

1980s

1990s

2000s

2010s

2020s

See also 
 Short Film
 BAFTA Award for Best Short Film
 Academy Award for Best Animated Short Film

Notes

Superlatives 

For this Academy Award category, the following superlatives emerge:

 Most awards: Walt Disney  6 awards (resulting from 13 nominations)
 Most nominations: Gordon Hollingshead  20 nominations (resulting in 5 awards)

References

Live Action Short Film